Kerr's noctuid moth (Agrotis kerri) is a species of moth in the family Noctuidae.

This moth is endemic to the French Frigate Shoals in the Northwestern Hawaiian Islands.

References

Lepidoptera of the Outlying Hawaiian Islands

kerri
Endemic moths of Hawaii
Natural history of the Northwestern Hawaiian Islands
Taxonomy articles created by Polbot
Moths described in 1920